Caldicott is a historic house in Somerset County, Maryland, United States.

Caldicott may also refer to:

Caldicott (surname)
Caldicott School, a prep school for boys in Buckinghamshire, England
Caldicott Report

See also
Caldicot (disambiguation)
Caldecott (disambiguation)